Christine Norrie is a comic book artist, known for her work on the graphic novel Cheat. Norrie has also worked extensively as an artist and inker on various comic books, including a syndicated comic series that accompanied the first three movies of the Spy Kids franchise for the Disney Adventures magazine, and various Oni Press publications, including art for Hopeless Savages and inks for Queen & Country. In December 2006, Scholastic's Graphic Novel imprint, Graphix, released the latest work by Norrie, the 192-page Breaking Up, with New York Times best-selling author, Aimee Friedman.

Her 2009 work includes Secret Identities, which describes itself as "The Asian American superhero anthology".

Bibliography

 Hopeless Savages, 2001–2004
 Queen & Country: Vol. 2: Operation: Morningstar, 2002
 Cheat, 2003
 Grosse Pointe Girl: Tales from a Suburban Adolescence, 2004
 Fashion High: Breaking Up, 2007
 Black Canary Wedding Special #1, 2007
 American Virgin, Volume 3: Wet, 2007
 Lumberjanes: 2016 Special: Makin' the Ghost of It, 2016
 Lumberjanes: Bonus Tracks, 2018

References

External links
 Official site
 Blog at LiveJournal

Living people
Year of birth missing (living people)
American female comics artists